Vandinho may refer to:

Vandinho (footballer, born 1978), Vanderson Válter de Almeida, Brazilian football midfielder
Vandinho (footballer, born 1980), Vanderlei Bernardo Oliveira, Brazilian football attacking midfielder
Vandinho (footballer, born August 1986), Vanderson da Silva Souza, Brazilian football striker
Vandinho (footballer, born September 1986), Vanderson Gomes Crisóstomo, Brazilian football midfielder
Vandinho (futsal player), Evandro Borges, Brazilian futsal winger